Fijian-born Australian singer and songwriter Paulini has released four studio albums, one extended play, nineteen singles (including two as a featured artist), and twelve music videos. Paulini placed fourth on the first season of Australian Idol in 2003, and subsequently signed a recording contract with Sony BMG Australia. Her debut studio album, One Determined Heart (2004), debuted at number one on the ARIA Albums Chart, where it remained for two consecutive weeks, and was certified platinum by the Australian Recording Industry Association (ARIA) for shipments of 70,000 copies. Its lead single "Angel Eyes" remained at number one on the ARIA Singles Chart for three consecutive weeks and was also certified platinum, while the second single "We Can Try" peaked at number 30. Paulini followed with the release of her debut EP, Amazing Grace: Songs for Christmas (2004), which peaked at number 70.

Paulini's second studio album Superwoman (2006) failed to match the commercial success of her debut album, and only managed to reach number 72. Despite the underperformance of Superwoman, the album produced the singles "Rough Day", "So Over You" and "I Believe". During this time, Paulini enjoyed commercial success again as a member of the Australian girl group Young Divas. The group released two top-ten albums, Young Divas (2006) and New Attitude (2007), and achieved three top-fifteen singles, including the hugely successful "This Time I Know It's for Real". After Paulini parted ways with the Young Divas and ended her contract with Sony BMG in 2008, she focused more on songwriting. Through a publishing deal with independent label Albert Music, Paulini was able to travel and write songs in Europe, New York and Los Angeles. She wrote songs for several recording artists in Europe, including Monrose, Edurne and Yoann Fréget.

Aside from her songwriting work, Paulini continued to release singles independently between 2009 and 2013. She was also featured on the 2010 single "Believe Again" by Irish recording artist Ronan Keating. Paulini signed a joint record deal with Ambition Records and Decca Records Australia in 2014, and released her long-awaited third studio album Come Alive the following year. A moderate success, the album debuted at number 25 on the ARIA Albums Chart and included the singles "Air It All Out" and "By My Side". This was followed by the release of Paulini's fourth studio album Merry Christmas (2015), which featured cover versions of popular Christmas tunes and failed to impact the charts.

Albums

Extended plays

Singles

As a lead artist

As a featured artist

Other appearances

Music videos

Songwriting credits

See also 
Young Divas discography

References

External links 

Pop music discographies
Discographies of Australian artists
Discographies of Fijian artists